In forestry and silviculture, a sanitation harvest or sanitation cutting is a harvest of trees for the purpose of removing insects or diseases from a stand of trees.  Sanitation harvesting is used to prevent the diseases or pests from spreading to other nearby trees.  It is a form of intermediate management and is used in order to improve an already existing stand of trees.

See also
Forest pathology
Salvage logging
Silviculture

References

Forest management